François van Knibbergen (1596, The Hague – 1674), was a Dutch Golden Age landscape painter.

Biography
According to Houbraken he took part in a painting contest with Jan van Goyen and Jan Porcellis. Of the three finished paintings, the one done by Porcellis was considered the best.

According to the RKD he was a pupil in The Hague of Michiel van den Sande from Utrecht, with whom he traveled to Rome in 1614. He was back in Utrecht in 1615 and became a member of the Confrerie Pictura in the Hague in 1629. His daughter Catharina also became a landscape painter.

References

François van Knibbergen on Artnet

External links
 

1596 births
1674 deaths
Dutch Golden Age painters
Dutch male painters
Artists from The Hague
Painters from The Hague